Dohmann is a surname. Notable people with the surname include:

Carl Dohmann (born 1990), German racewalker
Scott Dohmann (born 1978), American baseball player

See also
Dohlmann